The Rutland Militia was a militia regiment in the United Kingdom from 1759 to 1860, when it was amalgamated into the Northampton and Rutland Militia.

The regiment was formed at Oakham in 1759, and consisted of only two companies. In 1803 it was ranked as the 63rd regiment of militia, and in 1810 redesignated as light infantry. In 1833 it was re-ranked as the 4th, and then in 1855 as the 14th.

In 1860, it amalgamated with the Northampton Militia to form the Northampton and Rutland Militia, which later became the Special Reserve battalion of The Northamptonshire Regiment.

References
Rutland Militia, regiments.org

Bibliography

Infantry regiments of the British Army
Military units and formations established in 1759
Military units and formations disestablished in 1860
Military history of Rutland
Rutland